Mwita Mwikwabe Waitara (born 17 July 1976) is a Tanzanian politician and a member of the CCM political party. He was elected MP representing Ukonga in 2015.He left his political party CHADEMA and join CCM from 28 July 2018. On 10 November 2018 he was appointed as Deputy Minister of State by President John Magufuli. On 13 November 2018 he was officially sworn in as Deputy Minister of State in the President's Office, Regional Administration and Local Government.

References 

1976 births
Tanzanian politicians
Living people
Tanzanian MPs 2015–2020
Tanzanian MPs 2020–2025